Lusigny-sur-Ouche is a commune in the Côte-d'Or department in the region of Bourgogne-Franche-Comté in eastern France.

Population

See also
Communes of the Côte-d'Or department

References

Communes of Côte-d'Or